The Kittiwake 23, also called the Kittiwake 24 and the Kenner Kittiwake, is an American trailerable sailboat that was designed by Carl Alberg as a cruiser and first built in 1966. It is named for the species of gull.

The boat is a development of the Alberg-designed South Coast 23, with a modified, stepped cabin top shape.

Production
The design was built by the Kenner Boat Company, Ray Greene & Company and River City Sailcraft in the United States, but it is now out of production.

The Alberg-designed South Coast 23 hulls were originally built by Kenner under contract to South Coast Sea Craft. South Coast Sea Craft took the molds and moved them to a new facility in about 1965. Kenner used one remaining hull to build a new mold, with a slightly lengthened stern and a new cabin top design, creating the Kittiwake, which was put into production, without crediting Alberg as the designer. The Kenner Boat Company was sold to AJ Industries in about 1969 and continued as an AJ division, Kenner Sailing Yachts, with the Kittiwake remaining in production. In 1973 Ray Greene & Company purchased the molds and continued production until it went out of business in 1975. The molds were acquired by River City Sailcraft who continued production from 1976 until 1978 when a factory fire destroyed the molds, ending production of the design.

The boat was also sold by Kenner as a kit for amateur completion.

Design
The Kittiwake 23 is a recreational keelboat, built predominantly of hand-laid fiberglass, with marine mahogany bulkheads and teak trim. It has a masthead sloop rig; a spooned, raked stem; a raised counter, angled transom, a keel-mounted rudder controlled by a tiller and a fixed long keel. It displaces  and carries  of lead ballast.

The boat is normally fitted with a small  well-mounted outboard motor for docking and maneuvering.

The design has sleeping accommodation for four people, with a double "V"-berth in the bow cabin and two straight settee berths in the main cabin. The galley is located just aft of the forward cabin. The head is located in the bow cabin, under the "V"-berth.

Operational history
The boat was at one time supported by a class club, the Kittiwake 23 Sailboat Registry, but it seems to no longer exist.

See also
List of sailing boat types

Related development
South Coast 23

References

External links
Photo of a Kittiwake 23
Photo of a Kittiwake 24 sailing
Video tour of a Kittiwake 23

Keelboats
1960s sailboat type designs
Sailing yachts
Trailer sailers
Sailboat types built in the United States
Sailboat type designs by Carl Alberg
Sailboat types built by Ray Greene & Company
Sailboat types built by Kenner Boat Company
Sailboat types built by River City Sailcraft